Indigenous peoples of Panama, or Native Panamanians, are the native peoples of Panama. According to the 2010 census, they make up 12.3% of the overall population of 3.4 million, or just over 418,000 people. The Ngäbe and Buglé comprise half of the indigenous peoples of Panama.

Many of the Indigenous Peoples live on comarca indígenas, which are administrative regions for areas with substantial Indigenous populations. Three comarcas (Comarca Emberá-Wounaan, Guna Yala, Ngäbe-Buglé) exist as equivalent to a province, with two smaller comarcas (Guna de Madugandí and Guna de Wargandí) subordinate to a province and considered equivalent to a corregimiento (municipality).

Indigenous groups
Bokota, Bocas Del Toro
Embera, southeastern Darién Province
Guaymí (including the Movere and Murire peoples), mainly Chiriquí Province
Guna, Darién Province and Caribbean side.
Buglé, mainly Chiriquí Province
Talamanca
Teribe
Wounaan, southeastern Darién Province

Languages
Some native peoples speak Spanish, while many more retain their traditional languages. According to the 2000 census, the following indigenous languages are spoken in Panama:
Bokota language: 933 speakers (in Panama)
Bri-bri language: 2,521 speakers
Buglé language: 17,731 speakers
Emberá language: 22,485 speakers
Guna Language: 61,707 speakers
Naso-Teribe language: 3,305 speakers
Ngöbe language: 169,130 speakers
Wounaan language: 6,882 speakers

Notes

External links

Distribution of Indigenous Populations in Panama by Province and Comarca, 2000

 
Indigenous peoples of Central America
Ethnic groups in Panama